Roma is a unisex given name in many languages, and is the feminine form of the name Roman in some languages. It is also a female given name in Slavic cultures. In Hindu mythology, Roma is an alternate name for Lakshmi, the goddess of prosperity.
It is often short for Romany, a name commonly given to girls not of Romany extraction, and rarely given to those of Romany extraction.

Another source is Roma, Italian for Rome, the capital of Italy, and is given in that spirit.

Bearers of the name
Roma Downey, Northern Irish actress
Roma Gąsiorowska, Polish actress and fashion designer
Roma Guillon Le Thière (c. 1837–1903), Italian actress
Roma Ligocka, Polish writer and painter
Roma Manek, Gujarati actress
Roma Ryan, Northern Irish writer, poet, and lyricist
Roma Torre, American television journalist and theater critic

References

Unisex given names